The Turboletae or Turboleti (Greek: Torboletoi or Torboletes) were an obscure pre-Roman people from ancient Spain, which lived in the northwest Teruel province since the early 3rd Century BC.

Origins 
Their ethnical and linguistical affiliation is difficult to determine, though it seems that they were of part-Celtic, part-Illyrian ancestry, being confused by some ancient authors with either the Iberian Turdetani of Baetica or the Turduli.

Culture 
Their capital was the town of Turda, Turba, Turbola or Turbula, whose precise location is unknown, with some archeologists tentatively placing it at the Iron Age site of Alto Chácon (Muela de San Juan), in the vicinity of modern Teruel. No other pre-Roman sites connected with this people have been identified though recent archeological surveys at some Iron Age settlements in the Teruel region show that they were culturally affiliated with the Celtiberians. It has also been attributed to them the celtiberian inscription of Peñalva de Villastar.

History 
A warlike people whose tribal name later became a byword for unruly behaviour, the Turboletae were a constant source of trouble to most of their neighbours.  Not only they harassed the Celtiberian Belli and Titii, but also raided the southeastern Iberian peoples throughout most of the 3rd century BC, in particularly the Edetanian city-state of Saguntum.  As allies of Carthage the Turboletae actively participated in the incident that triggered the 2nd Punic War, the siege of Saguntum in 219-218 BC, where they assisted the Carthaginian troops in the final assault and looting of the city, slaughtering a great deal of its inhabitants.  The backlash came in 212 BC when the Romans and their Edetani allies invaded Turboletania, seized the capital Turba and razed it to the ground, selling his residents to slavery.

In 205 BC the exhausted Turboletae sued for peace, on which the Roman Senate forced them to pay a huge compensation to the surviving citizens of Saguntum. However, the resentment fuelled by the heavy tribute imposed, coupled with the destruction of their capital city in the previous years may account for the Tuboletae revolt of 196 BC, under the apparent leadership of two generals named Budares and Baesadines.  After being crushed by Quintus Minucius Thermus, Praetor of Hispania Citerior in a pitched battle near the ruins of Turba, the remaining Turboletae population appears to have been either obliterated or simply reduced to subject status and their devastated lands divided among the Bastetani and Edetani, resulting in their total disappearance from the historical record.

See also 
Celtiberians
Celtiberian script
Illyrians
Lobetani
Pre-Roman peoples of the Iberian Peninsula

Notes

References

 Ángel Montenegro et alii, Historia de España 2 - colonizaciones y formación de los pueblos prerromanos (1200-218 a.C), Editorial Gredos, Madrid (1989) 
B. Dexter Hoyos, Unplanned Wars: The Origins of the First and Second Punic Wars, Untersuchungen zur antiken Literatur und Geschichte Book 50, De Gruyter 2012 (1st edition).  – 
 Francisco Burillo Motoza, Los Celtíberos – Etnias y Estados, Crítica, Grijalbo Mondadori, S.A., Barcelona (1998, revised edition 2007) 
 John Drogo Montagu, Battles of the Greek and Roman worlds – A Chnological Compendium of 667 Battles to 31 BC, from the Historians of the Ancient World, Greenhill Books, London (2000)

Further reading

Daniel Varga, The Roman Wars in Spain: The Military Confrontation with Guerrilla Warfare, Pen & Sword Military, Barnsley (2015) 
Ludwig Heinrich Dyck, The Roman Barbarian Wars: The Era of Roman Conquest, Author Solutions (2011) , 1426981821 

Pre-Roman peoples of the Iberian Peninsula
Celtic tribes of the Iberian Peninsula
Ancient peoples of Spain